Irina Kovalenko (1984 Murmansk) is a Russian model.

She won “Miss Murmansk” and “The Beauty of Russia” titles in 2001. She represented Russia at Miss World pageant same year and she made it to the top-10 finalists.

Irina studied at the Moscow Language Academy. She speaks Russian and English.

References 

1984 births
Living people
People from Murmansk
Russian female models
Russian beauty pageant winners
Miss World 2001 delegates